Ayman Mohyeldin (born April 18, 1979) is an Egyptian-born political commentator based in New York for NBC News and MSNBC. Previously the anchor of an MSNBC weekday afternoon show, Ayman Mohyeldin Reports (formerly MSNBC Live with Ayman Mohyeldin), he currently hosts Ayman on weekend evenings on MSNBC, and Fridays on Peacock. He previously worked for Al Jazeera and CNN. He was one of the first Western journalists allowed to enter and report on the handing over and trial of the deposed President of Iraq Saddam Hussein by the Iraqi Interim Government for crimes against humanity. Mohyeldin has also covered the 2008–09 Gaza War as well as the Arab Spring.

Early life
Mohyeldin was born in Cairo, Egypt, to an Egyptian father, Medhat Mohyeldin, and a Palestinian mother, Abla Awwad. His father is a certified public accountant in Marietta, Georgia. Mohyeldin has an older brother, Ahmed, who is a resident neurosurgeon at the Ohio State University Wexner Medical Center and former professional soccer star for the Atlanta Silverbacks. Mohyeldin lived in Egypt until the age of 5 when his parents emigrated to the U.S. He attended North Cobb High School in Kennesaw, Georgia.

Mohyeldin received his undergraduate education at American University in Washington D.C., earning a BA in International Relations with a focus on the European Union. He received an MA in International Politics with a focus on Peace and Conflict Resolution. His graduate thesis was entitled "The News Media Paradigm in the War on Terrorism," and, in 2002, it was accepted by the International Association of Media Researchers Conference in Barcelona, Spain. He lived in Iraq from 2003–2005 as a foreign news producer with CNN.

Career

Mohyeldin began his career in journalism working at NBC, as a desk assistant for the Washington D.C. bureau. Mohyeldin's first major assignments happened shortly after 9/11. In an interview with PRWeek, he describes the opportunities that arose in the aftermath of 9/11: "There was a real shortage of people with language skills or expertise in the Middle East. Just because of my language skills and the timing, so to speak, I got a lot of experience. I was thrown into a mix of things that normally desk assistants at my level would not have gotten. I started working on some big pieces that had to do with investigating 9/11 and all kinds of international terrorist connections... I was doing translation mostly, but I was also developing themes or threads to stories that either had some Middle East connection to them or some type of Arabic language skills required. So it was an unbelievable experience at a really young age."

Mohyeldin's coverage of major news events in the Arab World and Middle East include the Iraq War, the first multi-candidate presidential Egyptian elections in 2005, Israel's withdrawal from the Gaza Strip and the 2005 Palestinian elections in the Gaza Strip. He has covered the Sharm al-Sheikh resort bombing (July 2005) and the Jordan Hotel bombings (November 2005).

As a producer, Mohyeldin became the first journalist to enter one of Libya's nuclear research facilities after producing Col. Muammar al-Gaddafi's first interview announcing Libya would abandon all WMD programs. Mohyeldin's work in the CNN documentary "Iraq:progress report" about the daily struggles of Iraqis during the war was nominated for an Emmy Award. He served as an associate producer for the NBC News Special that also received Emmy nominations for "Ship at War: Inside the Carrier Stennis" and "Inside the Real West Wing." Mohyeldin has also covered the annual Muslim Pilgrimage (Hajj) to Mecca and was involved in the production of CNN specials "Islam: The Struggle Within" and "Hajj: A Spiritual Journey."

In 2008–2009, Mohyeldin covered the Israeli attack on Gaza. The coverage of his reporting, along with Sherine Tadros has been released in the documentary " The War Around Us". He reported on the intricate network of tunnels that were once used for smuggling of weapons and people across the Egyptian-Gaza border and are now a vital route into Gaza for medicine, food and fuel supplies.

In 2011, Mohyeldin left Al Jazeera English and returned to NBC where he extensively covered the second "Arab Uprising" in Egypt in 2013. He also covered the unrest in Ukraine, and most recently the unrest in Iraq.

2011 Egyptian revolution 
Mohyeldin covered the 2011 Egyptian Revolution for Al Jazeera English. On January 28, 2011, he broadcast from the Al Jazeera news building in Cairo for several hours straight, reporting on the Egyptian protests as protesters and Egyptian police battled for control of the 6th October Bridge. On January 30, Anis El Fekki of the Egyptian Interior Ministry revoked Al Jazeera's broadcast license and forced the closure of their Cairo bureau, claiming the network was conspiring with opposition groups to overthrow the government. He was one of five Al Jazeera journalists arrested and briefly detained by Egyptian authorities the following day, after the network refused to cease broadcasting upon the loss of their accreditation.

On February 6, 2011, Mohyeldin was again arrested by the Egyptian military upon trying to enter Tahrir square. He was released nine hours later.

On September 20, 2011, Mohyeldin rejoined NBC News, where his career began.

In January 2012, Mohyeldin traveled to Syria to cover the months-old uprising. Among the cities he visited was Daraa.

In the summer of 2013 Mohyeldin extensively covered the removal of President Mohamed Morsi from power In Egypt. That fall he also extensively covered the Syrian civil war and the effects of refugees overflowing into neighboring Lebanon. Mohyeldin also covered the agreement of Syria to dispose of their chemical weapons program.

During the uprisings in Ukraine in 2014, Mohyeldin covered extensively in both Kiev and Donetsk. He traveled to the border in Eastern Ukraine and reported on Russian troop buildup, and the Ukrainian response. He also went "behind the scenes" into the occupied government buildings to report.

2014 Israel–Gaza conflict 
Mohyeldin was sent by NBC as a correspondent to Gaza at the beginning of the one month-long 2014 conflict. His coverage was praised by media critics such as Glenn Greenwald for departing from "the standard pro-Israel coverage that dominates establishment American press coverage".

Two weeks into the conflict, on July 16, 2014, Mohyeldin witnessed and reported via a series of tweets, the death of 4 Palestinian children who were playing soccer and hide-and-seek on a Gaza beach. The first missile killed one child and the second killed the other 3. The killings were witnessed by many in the international press. Just moments earlier Mohyeldin was kicking a soccer ball with these boys in front of his hotel. The Israeli government claimed that the beach was shelled in response to Hamas rocket fire allegedly originating from that area, though journalists who attended the scene said the beach was empty but for a fisherman's hut and a few tools.

Although Mohyeldin was a live witness to the event, NBC correspondent Richard Engel reported the story from Tel Aviv. NBC followed by pulling Mohyeldin from Gaza and terminating his reporting duties from Gaza indefinitely. Engel was sent to replace him in Gaza. NBC was subsequently criticized by independent media outlets for removing Mohyeldin, with many believing he was singled out for portraying Palestinians with empathy and social media trends accusing NBC of pro-Israel bias.

Mohyeldin was returned to Gaza on July 18, 2014, after NBC received heavy criticism for pulling him out of Gaza. On Sunday, August 3, 2014, he announced via social media that after 4 weeks on the road he was "taking time to be with family.." Less than 48 hours later, Israel and Hamas agreed to a cease fire.

Allegation of bias during live news report 
In October 2015 Mohyeldin was accused of false reporting and bias during live coverage of report where a Palestinian man wearing camouflaged clothing sprang out from a group of Israeli soldiers, wielding a knife and was subsequently shot. Mohyeldin initially reported during a live MSNBC broadcast that from where he was standing and the body was lying he did not see a knife in the man’s open hands after he saw the dead body. However he was interrupted on air by the host at the time, José Díaz-Balart, who ran a picture of the assailant holding what seemed to be a knife in the air before he was killed. Following the MSNBC journalist's interruption, Mohyeldin reiterated that the assailant did not have a knife in his hands after he was dead and secured by the Israeli police.

Following his coverage of the June 2016 Tel Aviv shooting, an Israeli newspaper, The Jerusalem Post, criticized Mohyeldin for going "on a rambling, 35 second stream of consciousness in which he managed to squeeze in four mentions of 'the occupation' and three mentions of Israeli politics 'shifting to the right' or the 'extreme right,' while talking of Palestinian 'frustration' and Israeli oppression."

MSNBC shows 
Mohyeldin has hosted a number of shows on MSNBC since joining NBC News in 2011, including First Look, an early-morning show, and Ayman Mohyeldin Reports (originally MSNBC Live with Ayman Mohyeldin), a weekday afternoon show. In September 2021, his program Ayman took over the weekend evening spot formerly held by Joshua Johnson's The Week with Joshua Johnson, and it also streams on Peacock on Fridays, while Hallie Jackson took over his weekday afternoon slot. He is also a fill in guest host on MSNBC's All In with Chris Hayes, Deadline: White House, The Beat with Ari Melber and The Rachel Maddow Show.

Shortly after the 2021 United States Capitol attack, Mohyeldin received a call from a high school classmate in Kennesaw, Georgia, whose sister-in-law Rosanne Boyland died in the attack. Investigating how Boyland died and how "a previously apolitical 34-year-old homebody [was] so quickly radicalized in the summer of 2020" led to a five-part podcast entitled American Radical that premiered in December 2021.

Personal life
Mohyeldin married Tunisian model Kenza Fourati on April 26, 2016 in a private ceremony in Marietta, Georgia, where his parents currently reside.

His wife revealed in a Vogue Arabia interview that the couple was expecting their first child in early 2017. Their daughter, Dora Fourati Mohyeldin, was born in New York on March 12, 2017. The couple welcomed their second child, Idris, a son, in 2019.

References

External materials
 Gazze'yi tek başına savunan gazeteci! Haber vaktim
 GAZA STRIP: In praise of Al Jazeera, Part 1 LA Times
 GAZA STRIP: In praise of Al Jazeera, Part 2 LA Times
 For Civilians, 'There Is No Safe Zone In Gaza' NPR
 Gideon Levy / My hero of the Gaza war Haarretz
 Twilight Zone / Trumpeting for war Haarretz
 Al Jazeera provides an inside look at Gaza conflict The International Herald Tribune
 Al Jazeera English Beats Israel's Ban on Reporters in Gaza with Exclusive Coverage The Huffington Post
 Al-Jazeera becomes the face of the frontline Financial Times
 Gazze büyük bir hapishane Haber vaktim
 Twitter page of Ayman Mohyeldin
 The Dangers and Difficulties of Reporting from Gaza - video by Democracy Now!

Egyptian journalists
American male journalists
American Muslims
Al Jazeera people
1979 births
American University School of International Service alumni
Living people
MSNBC people
NBC News people
Egyptian emigrants to the United States
Egyptian people of Palestinian descent